Griphognathus (from   'riddle') and   'jaw') is an extinct genus of lungfish from the late Devonian period of Europe and Australia.

The lower jaw and palate were lined with tooth-like denticles. Like all other lungfish, its skin was covered by overlapping scales, and it had an asymmetrical tail.

Species

Griphognathus whitei

References

Prehistoric fish of Australia
Prehistoric lungfish genera
Devonian bony fish
Late Devonian animals
Late Devonian fish
Devonian fish of Europe